Paschoal Caetano Rapuano (23 May 1910 – 11 December 2003) was a Brazilian rower who competed in the 1936 Summer Olympics. He was born in Rio de Janeiro in 1910 and died there in 2003.

References

External links
 

1910 births
2003 deaths
Brazilian male rowers
Olympic rowers of Brazil
Rowers at the 1936 Summer Olympics